Carcereiros ( Jailers) is a Brazilian crime drama television series. It was produced by Rede Globo and released by the Globoplay streaming service. The first season was released on the service on June 8, 2017. The series debuted on Rede Globo free-to-air television network on April 26, 2018 and ended on January 22, 2021. It is written by Marçal Aquino, Fernando Bonassi and Dennison Ramalho with collaboration of Marcelo Starobinas, inspired by Dráuzio Varella's book of the same name. Artistic direction is by José Eduardo Belmonte.

Plot 
Adriano is a graduate in history, who becomes a penitentiary agent to follow in the footsteps of his father, Tibério. His colleagues of profession, Vinícius and Isaías, along with the head of security Juscelino, help him cope up with the problems of the work environment. They have to deal with the grumpy penitentiary agent, Valdir.

The prison, directed by Vilma, is out of control, and becomes the main setting. Adriano must deal with the challenges and ponder the two rival factions that command the place. The main one is led by Binho and his wife Kelly. He must balance his work with time with his family.

Cast

Main 
 Rodrigo Lombardi as Adriano Ferreira de Araújo
 Giovanna Rispoli as Lívia Macedo de Araújo
 Mariana Nunes as Janaína Macedo
 Othon Bastos as Tibério Ferreira de Araújo
 Tony Tornado as Valdir
 Lourinelson Vladimir as Isaías (main, season 1; guest, season 2)
 Aílton Graça as Juscelino (season 1)
 Nani de Oliveira as Dr. Vilma Alencar (season 1)
 Jean Amorim as Vinícius (season 1)
 Ernani Moraes as Rubão (guest, season 1; main, seasons 2–3)
 Kaysar Dadour as Abdel (season 3)

Recurring 
 Samantha Schmütz as Solange
 Letícia Sabatella as Érika Guimarães
 Milton Gonçalves as Dr. Louveira
 Leonardo Medeiros as Dr. Aramis (guest, season 1; recurring, seasons 2–3)
 Babu Santana as Edgar de Souza (season 2–3)
 Mariana Ruggiero as Mariana (season 2–3)

Production 
The series was supposed to be starred by Domingos Montagner, however, with the death of the actor during the shooting of the telenovela Velho Chico, the role passed to Rodrigo Lombardi.

The first season of the series was shot at the  "Votorantim Women's Penitentiary", in Votorantim, São Paulo before its inauguration in March 2017. The shooting took place in 2016 and had participation of local actors.

Episodes

Series overview

Season 1 (2017)

Season 2 (2019)

Season 3: Noite Sem Fim (2021)

References

External links
 
 

2017 Brazilian television series debuts
2021 Brazilian television series endings
2010s Brazilian television series
Brazilian crime television series
Brazilian drama television series
Brazilian prison television series
Portuguese-language television shows
Rede Globo original programming
Works about organized crime in Brazil